Wendy Boglioli (born March 6, 1955) is an American former swimmer, Olympic champion, and former world record-holder.  After retiring from competition swimming, she became a coach, and later, a motivational speaker. She grew up in Land O' Lakes, Wisconsin.

1976 Montréal Olympics
She is best known for winning the gold medal in the women's 4×100-meter freestyle relay in world record time at the 1976 Montréal Olympics with teammates Shirley Babashoff, Kim Peyton and Jill Sterkel. The gold was particularly crucial to the U.S. women's team as it was the only gold medal awarded to them during the games.

Boglioli also won the bronze medal in the women's 100-meter butterfly, behind East German swimmers Kornelia Ender and Andrea Pollack.  During the 1990s, it was confirmed that Ender and Pollack were given performance-enhancing drugs during the East German doping scandal of the 1970s.  Therefore, Boglioli most likely would have won the gold medal, were it not for the presence of Ender and Pollack.

Life after the Olympics
Boglioli served as assistant coach of the Yale Bulldogs swimming and diving team at Yale University, together with her husband Bernie Boglioli.

In 1979, the Supersisters trading card set was produced and distributed; one of the cards featured Boglioli's name and picture.

Boglioli began competitive track cycling at the age of 40. She competed in the 1995 and 1996 U.S. Masters Track Cycling National Championship where she earned a total of 8 Gold Medals.(USA Masters Track Cycling, USCF). She also competed in the Senior National Track Championships in Colorado Springs, Colorado in 1996.(USCF)

In 1997, she entered the long-term care insurance field, and served as national spokeswoman for Genworth Financial's Long Term Care Division. Her trademarked In the Arms of Women initiative was the first of its kind in the industry to recognize the distinctive needs of women clients.

In 2004, she was honored as a Distinguished Alumna of Monmouth University.

In 2007, she was inducted into Monmouth University's Sports Hall of Fame.

In 2008, she appeared in a BBC-produced documentary (airing on PBS) titled Doping for Gold, which later was nominated for an Emmy Award in the Documentary category.

She is featured in a 2016 documentary titled The Last Gold which shows her and her teammates in 1976 at the Montreal Olympics.

Together with her husband of 40 years, she mainly resides in Hood River, Oregon, and has three children and three grandchildren. She continues her travels throughout the country giving motivational speeches to both corporations and social groups entitled "Finding the Champion Within". Her trademarked presentations "Physically Strong and Financially Sound" are also presented throughout the country to consumers and financial professionals. She also works with triathletes in the pool on a one on one basis.

See also

 List of Monmouth University alumni
 List of Olympic medalists in swimming (women)
 World record progression 4 × 100 metres freestyle relay

References

Bibliography 

 De George, Matthew,  Pooling Talent: Swimming's Greatest Teams, Rowman & Littlefield, Lanham, Maryland (2014).  .

External links
Wendy Boglioli's web site
Harvard Crimson article on Boglioli

1955 births
Living people
American female butterfly swimmers
American female freestyle swimmers
American swimming coaches
World record setters in swimming
Monmouth Hawks women's swimmers
Olympic bronze medalists for the United States in swimming
Olympic gold medalists for the United States in swimming
People from Merrill, Wisconsin
People from Vilas County, Wisconsin
Swimmers at the 1976 Summer Olympics
Yale Bulldogs swimming coaches
Medalists at the 1976 Summer Olympics